Poonthotta Kaavalkaaran is a 1988 Indian Tamil-language action drama film directed by Senthilnathan, in his directorial debut. The film stars Vijayakanth, Raadhika, Anand, Vani Viswanath and Livingston. the movie was a blockbuster hit and ran more than 150 days in many theatres. The film's score was composed by Ilaiyaraaja and was released on 10 June 1988. It was remade in Sinhala as Ran Hadawatha and in Telugu as Dharma Teja.

Plot 

Like a gardener with all his tenderness for his flowers, an old vigilante takes under his wing a young couple of runaway lovers. He lavishes them with love and safety. The father of the young woman tries to eliminate the lover who is none other than the sworn enemy of the upholder of the law. It is because of him, that the woman of the hero lost their unique heir and cannot give birth anymore from now on. Horrible memories surface and put the old upholder of the law on a war footing, for his ultimate confrontation.

Cast 

 Vijayakanth as Anthony
 Raadhika as Sivagami
 Anand as Anand
 Vani Viswanath as Vidhya
 Livingston as Ramkumar
 S. S. Chandran as M.L.A.
Pandiyan as Muthu Batcha
M. N. Nambiar as D.S.P.
Malaysia Vasudevan as Sivagami's Father (Guest Appearance)
Thyagu as Ramkumar's Assistant
Senthil as Azhagu (Guest Appearance)
S. N. Lakshmi as Anand's Grandma
Kullamani
K. S. Jayalakshmi
Vijay Krishnaraj as Minister
 Kokila as Susheela
Subhala

Production 
Senthilnathan, son of Jambulingam who directed Nam Naadu with M. G. Ramachandran and erstwhile assistant of S. A. Chandrasekhar and V. Azhagappan made his directorial debut with this film.

Soundtrack 
The music was composed by Ilaiyaraaja. "Sindhiya Venmani" song is set to Srothaswini raaga and "Adi Kaana Karunkuyile" is set to HariKhamboji raaga."En Uyire Vaa" was set in Shankarabaranam ragam and "Paramal Partha nenjam" set in Sudhadhanyasi ragam while "Padatha Themangu" set in Natabhairavi ragam.

Reception 
Raadhika won the Cinema Express Award for Best Actress – Tamil.

References

External links 

1980s action drama films
1980s Tamil-language films
1988 directorial debut films
1988 films
Films directed by Senthilnathan
Films scored by Ilaiyaraaja
Indian action drama films
Tamil films remade in other languages